Under Wraps is a Disney Channel Original Movie that is a remake of the 1997 film of the same name. It premiered on October 1, 2021 on Disney Channel and was added to Disney+ on October 8, 2021.

Plot

Cast
 Christian J. Simon as Gilbert
 Malachi Barton as Marshall
 Sophia Hammons as Amy
 Phil Wright as Harold
 Melanie Brook as Buzzy
 Brent Stait as Kubot
 Jordana Largy as Diane, Marshall's mother
 Jaime M. Callica as Ted, Diane's boyfriend
 Karin Konoval as Ravensworth

Production

On November 13, 2020, it was announced that a remake of the film would premiere in October 2021 with Christian J. Simon, Malachi Barton, Sophia Hammons, and Phil Wright starring and Alex Zamm directing and co-writing the remake with William Robertson.
Filming took place in Vancouver from November to December 2020.  This television film premiered on October 1, 2021, and featured music by Jamie Christopherson and Oleksa Lozowchuk. It was primarily shot in its suburbs of New Westminster and Maple Ridge, British Columbia.

Reception

Under Wraps was viewed by 401,000 people and 0.09 percent of viewers aged 18–49 watched it.

Common Sense Media, Joly Herman gave it four out of five stars, emphasising its diversity, spookiness and comedy. Nightmarish Conjuring Sarah Musnicky gave the film a positive review.

Sequel
A sequel titled Under Wraps 2, was announced on February 7, 2022, with most of the cast returning. It premiered on September 25, 2022.

References

External links
 

2020s English-language films
2020s teen films
2021 films
2021 television films
American television films
Disney Channel Original Movie films
Films about Halloween
Mummy films